The Parliament of Coz Coz was a meeting between Mapuches chiefs held on January 18, 1907 to discuss land conflicts with non-Mapuche Chileans. The parliament was organized with the help of Capuchins who invited journalists from Valdivia and Santiago to the meeting. The parliament was held in the vicinity of Panguipulli.

References

Mapuche history
20th century in Chile
1907 in Chile
History of Los Ríos Region
Order of Friars Minor Capuchin